Juan E. Méndez (born December 11, 1944) is an Argentine lawyer, former United Nations Special Rapporteur on Torture and Other Cruel, Inhuman or Degrading Treatment or Punishment, and human rights activist known for his work on behalf of political prisoners.

Career
Méndez was born in Lomas de Zamora, on the outskirts of Buenos Aires. 
In 1970, he received his law degree from Stella Maris University in Mar del Plata, Buenos Aires province.

Early in his career, he became involved in representing political prisoners. As a result, he was arrested by the  Argentine military dictatorship and subjected to torture and administrative detention for 18 months. During this period, Amnesty International adopted him as a "Prisoner of Conscience," and in 1977, he was expelled from the country and moved to the United States.

Subsequently, Mendez worked for the Catholic Church in Aurora, Illinois, protecting the rights of migrant workers. In 1978, he joined the Lawyers' Committee for Civil Rights under the Law in Washington, D.C., and in 1982, he launched Human Rights Watch's (HRW) Americas Program. He continued to work at Human Rights Watch for 15 years, becoming their general counsel in 1994.  He is also a visiting scholar at American University Washington College of Law's Academy on Human Rights and Humanitarian Law, a Professor of Human Rights Law in Residence at the Washington College of Law, and the Faculty Director of the Anti-Torture Initiative at the law school.

From 1996 to 1999, Mendez served as the Executive Director of the Inter-American Human Rights Institute, based in Costa Rica. He then worked as a Professor of Law and Director of the Center for Civil and Human Rights at the University of Notre Dame in the United States from October 1999 to 2004.

In 2001, Mendez began working for the International Center for Transitional Justice (ICTJ), an international human rights NGO. He served as its president from 2004 to 2009 and now is its President Emeritus. In 2014, he was a member of the Open Society Justice Initiative board.

From November 2010 to October 31, 2016, he was the UN Special Rapporteur on Torture. The Center for Human Rights and Humanitarian Law of the Washington College of Law provided its support through the creation of the Anti-Torture Initiative, with the financial support of the Ford Foundation, the Open Society Foundation, and the Oak Foundation.  

Mendez has taught human rights law at Georgetown Law School, the Johns Hopkins School of Advanced International Studies, and the University of Oxford Masters Program in International Human Rights Law in the UK.

Mendez is on the Steering Committee of The Crimes Against Humanity Initiative, a rule of law project launched in 2008 by the Whitney R. Harris World Law Institute to study the need for a comprehensive convention on the prevention and punishment of crimes against humanity, analyze the necessary elements of such a convention, and draft a proposed treaty. The proposed treaty is now being debated before the UN International Law Commission.

In December 2021, the United Nations Human Rights Council appointed Mendez as a member of Racial Justice Body, a new mechanism to examine systemic racism and the excessive use of force against Africans and people of African descent by law enforcement worldwide. Mendez will be one of three members along with Yvonne Mokgoro of South Africa and Tracie L. Keesee of the United States.

Awards
He has received numerous awards for his work, including the Goler T. Butcher Medal from the American Society of International Law; a Doctorate Honoris Causa from the Université du Québec à Montréal (University of Quebec in Montreal); the "Monsignor Oscar A. Romero Award for Leadership in Service to Human Rights" by the University of Dayton; the "Jeanne and Joseph Sullivan Award" of the Heartland Alliance.; the Doctorate Honoris Causa from the Universidad Nacional de La Plata, Argentina (National University of La Plata), June 10, 2013; and the Letelier-Moffitt Human Rights Award from the Institute for Policy Studies in 2014.

See also
Responsibility to protect

References

External links
 Announcement from the United Nations of his appointment
 Interview on Democracy Now!
 Speech to Swarthmore College on the Darfur conflict
 Report of the Special Advisor on the Prevention of Genocide: Visit to Darfur, Sudan (PDF)
Juan Méndez:  U.S. Should Address WikiLeaks’ Disclosures of Torture - video interview by Democracy Now!

1944 births
American University alumni
Amnesty International prisoners of conscience held by Argentina
Argentine diplomats
20th-century Argentine lawyers
International law scholars
Living people
People from Lomas de Zamora
Argentine officials of the United Nations
United Nations Special Rapporteurs on torture
University of Notre Dame faculty
Notre Dame Law School faculty
Place of birth missing (living people)
Argentine prisoners and detainees
Argentine emigrants to the United States
21st-century Argentine lawyers